The Billboard Top Latin Albums chart, published in Billboard magazine, is a record chart that features Latin music sales information. The data is compiled by Nielsen SoundScan from a sample that includes music stores, music departments at electronics and department stores, Internet sales (both physical and digital) and verifiable sales from concert venues in the United States.

During the 1990s, there were 36 number-one albums in this chart, which was first published on July 10, 1993. One album peaked at number one in the first year of publication: Mi Tierra, by Cuban singer-songwriter Gloria Estefan. The album also peaked at number 27 on the Billboard 200, and was certified platinum by the Recording Industry Association of America (RIAA). It won the Best Traditional Tropical Album award at the Grammy Awards of 1994. Mi Tierra spent 25 weeks at number one in 1993 and 33 weeks at this position in 1994. Segundo Romance by Mexican singer Luis Miguel also peaked at number one; this album was at the top for 29 consecutive weeks, starting in late 1994. It won the Grammy Award for Best Latin Pop Album in 1995, defeating albums from singers Cristian Castro, Plácido Domingo, Juan Gabriel and Tejano music group La Mafia; the latter also peaked at number one in March 1995 with their live album Éxitos En Vivo.

Five albums by Tex-Mex music performer Selena reached number one on the chart; her album Amor Prohibido was number one during four separate stretches, including a 16-week stay at the top that started three weeks after her death. After this stretch, it was replaced by her first English-language album titled Dreaming of You, which also debuted at number one in the Billboard 200, making Selena the first Hispanic singer to debut at the top of this chart and the second-highest debut of the year after Michael Jackson's HIStory: Past, Present and Future, Book I. On its release date, the album sold over 175,000 copies, a record for a female pop singer, and sold two million copies in its first year. This album became the first to peak at number one in three calendar years (1995–1997). Three best-of collections by the singer, entitled Siempre Selena, Anthology and All My Hits - Todos Mis Exitos Vol. 1 also topped the chart. The self-titled debut album by Enrique Iglesias was atop the chart for 11 weeks and won the Grammy Award for Best Latin Pop Album at the 39th Grammy Awards. Two albums related to the song "Macarena" hit the top spot of the chart: Macarena Non Stop by Los del Río, which spent four non-consecutive weeks at number-one, starting on August 3, 1996, and Macarena Mix, a compilation album with music by Sandalo, Manolos, El Lupe and The Sacados, which spent nine weeks at number-one from September 21 through November 16, 1996.

Tango by Julio Iglesias, the last number-one album of 1996, spent 10 weeks at the top of the chart and became the best-selling Latin album of 1997. Romances by Luis Miguel won the Grammy Award for Best Latin Pop Album, debuted at number 14 in the Billboard 200, and spent 11 non-consecutive weeks at number one on this chart. In 1998, the compilation album released for the film Dance with Me, which starred Vanessa L. Williams and Chayanne, became the first soundtrack to reach the top spot of this chart. Buena Vista Social Club, produced by Ry Cooder, also peaked at number one and won the Grammy Award for Best Tropical Latin Performance. Me Estoy Enamorando by Alejandro Fernández spent nine weeks at the top of the chart and ended the year as the best-selling Latin album of 1998. Colombian singer-songwriter Shakira with ¿Dónde Están los Ladrones?, her first number-one album, spent 11 weeks at number one, received a nomination for a Grammy Award for Best Latin Rock/Alternative Album and was certified platinum in the United States by the RIAA. Marco Antonio Solís peaked at number one for the first time on this chart with his album Trozos de Mi Alma, which was certified gold by the RIAA and was produced by Bebu Silvetti. Ricky Martin was awarded the Grammy Award for Best Latin Pop Album for Vuelve, which spent 26 non-consecutive weeks at the top of the chart between 1998 and 1999. Latin rock performer Santana debuted and peaked at number one with Supernatural during the only week that the album appeared on this chart. The album was removed from the chart the following week after it was determined by Billboard to not meet the requirement for an album to have at least 50% of its recordings in Spanish.

Number-one albums

See also

1990s in Latin music

References

General

 For information about every week of this chart, follow this link; in the chart date section select a date and the top ten positions for the week selected will appear on screen, including the number-one album, which is shown in the table above.

Specific

1990s
United States Latin Albums
1990s in Latin music